Shoghakat TV is an Armenian television channel based in Yerevan, owned and operated by the Mother See of Holy Etchmiadzin; the regulating body of the Armenian Apostolic Church. The channel has been broadcasting since November 2002.

History 

The origin of the channel dates back to 1995, when a TV studio was opened in a small room within the prelacy building of the Araratian Pontifical Diocese, initiated by Catholicos Karekin II who was serving as primate vicar of the diocese at that time.

In 2002, Shoghakat TV received an official broadcasting license by the authorities of Armenia. The TV channel was released in order to illustrate the activities of the dioceses and also to promote the preaching of Armenian Apostolic Church. Programs and films produced by Shoghakat TV could be attained by other TV companies within Armenia, as well as through the Public TV of Armenia since 2004, for the diaspora Armenians.

The TV channel is being broadcast on air since November 2002. It has a viewer-ship of over 1 million residents living in Yerevan and in most regions of the country.

Shoghakat TV is producing and screening universal films about civilization, history, religion, nature, celebrities, global spiritual-cultural values, as well as covering public, economic, cultural, national-ecclesiastical events shown to the wide public via three dozen authorized programs. The viewers also have an opportunity to watch films and concert both of domestic and foreign production. Programs including sports and entertainment are also being broadcast.

The TV station is located in the Shengavit District of Yerevan, and the executive director is Mania Ghazaryan.

References

External links
Official website (English & Armenian)
Armenian TV
Shoghakat TV
Armenian TV

Television networks in Armenia
Television stations in Armenia
Television channels and stations established in 1998
Armenian-language television stations